The Classical Conspiracy is the second live album released by the Dutch symphonic metal band Epica. The recorded live show took part in Miskolc, Hungary on 14 June 2008 in the framework of the Miskolc Opera Festival, where the Swedish symphonic metal band Therion had done a similar show a year before. Epica performed on stage with a 40-piece orchestra and a 30-piece choir, entirely composed of Hungarian musicians conducted by Zsolt Regos. The expanded ensemble played classical music, excerpts from operas and movie soundtracks, as well as Epica's songs. The album  was released on 8 May 2009 through Nuclear Blast Records.

This is the first album featuring Ariën van Weesenbeek as the new official drummer of Epica and also the last album with founding member and lead guitarist Ad Sluijter, who had already left the band when the album was released.

Track listing

Personnel
Epica
Simone Simons – lead vocals
Mark Jansen – lead & rhythm guitar, grunts, screams, band arrangements on tracks 2, 6
Ad Sluijter – lead & rhythm guitar, editing
Yves Huts – bass, band arrangements on tracks 5, 7, 8, 11, 12
Coen Janssen – synthesizer, piano, orchestral and choir arrangements, band arrangements on tracks 2, 4, 7
Ariën van Weesenbeek – drums

Additional musicians
Amanda Somerville – choir vocals
Agnes Liptak – choir vocals

Choir of Miskolc National Theatre
 Boglarka Jambrik, Edina Kecskemeti, Eszter Maria Papp, Eva Orth, Eva Vajda, Ildiko Simon, Zsuzsa Adamy, Zsuzsa Kurucz, Agnes Liptak, Anette Cseh, Angelika Hircsu, Diana Kuttor, Linda Dolhai, Maria Takacs, Mariann Majlath, Oksana Pascsenko, Andras Marton, Erik Molnar, Gergely Boncser, Gergely Irlanda, Laszlo Bodor, Nandor Nandor, Tibor Osvath, Akos Baksy, Balazs Kolozsi, David Dani, Ivan Nagy, Robert Molnar, Sandor Demeter

Extended Reményi Ede Chamber Orchestra

 Beata Lukacs – violin
 Benjamin Almassy – violin
 Boglarka Balog – violin
 Doris Tatai – violin
 Eva Siklosi – violin
 Maria Lazanyi – violin
 Monika Zsekov – violin
 Zoltán Ficsor – violin
 Zoltan Kerenyi – violin
 Zsofia Nagy  – violin
 Tamas Kriston – violin
 Janos Feher – viola
 Jozsef Kautzky – viola
 Sandor Szabo – viola
 Tamás Tóth – viola
 Angelika Béres – celli
 Annamaria Bodi – celli
 Kamilla Matakovics – celli
 Arpad Balog – double bass
 Gizella Keresztfalvi – double bass
 Sandor Czimer – clarinet
 Tamas Fogarasi – clarinet
 Csaba Szilagyi – trombone
 Istvan Molnar – trombone
 Zoltan Kakuk – trombone
 Gyorgy Aranyosi – trumpet
 Peter Gál – trumpet
 Beata Tatar – oboe
 Janos Implom – oboe
 János Dobos – tuba
 Tamas Domotor – timpani
 István Halász – bassoon
 Krisztián Járdány – bassoon
 Eniko Frencz – French horn
 Ferenc Tornyai – French horn
 Gergely Opauszky – French horn
 Sándor Horváth – French horn
 Marianna Moori – flute
 Tamas Siklosi – flute
 Mark Virágh – percussion
 Andras Bujtas – keyboards

Production

Oliver Palotai – orchestral arrangements
Sascha Paeth – mixing, mastering
Zsolt Regos – choirmaster
Tamias Kriston – concertmaster
Hídvégi Dániel – live sound engineering
Gresiczki Tamás – live sound engineering
Olaf Reitmeier – editing
Miro – editing
Ad Sluijter – editing
Simon Oberender – editing, mixing, mastering
Stefan Heilemann – art direction, design
Levente Kovács – photography
Maria Schvab – photography
Patrakov Alexey – photography
Oleg Patrakov – photography
Rita Miklán – photography
Janos Adam – photography
László Mocsári – photography

Charts

References 

Epica (band) albums
2009 live albums
Nuclear Blast live albums